Ṭalḥa ibn ʿUbayd Allāh al-Taymī was a Companion of the Islamic prophet Muhammad. In Sunni Islam, he is mostly known for being among  ('the ten to whom Paradise was promised'). He played an important role in the Battle of Uhud and the Battle of the Camel, in which he died. According to Sunnis, he was given the title "The Generous" by Muhammad.

Biography 
Talha was born c.594, A member of the Taym clan of the Quraysh in Mecca, Talha was the son of Ubayd Allah ibn Uthman ibn Amr ibn Ka'b ibn Sa'd ibn Taym ibn Murra ibn Ka'b ibn Lu'ay ibn Ghalib and of al-Sa'ba bint Abd Allah, who was from the Hadram tribe. Talha's lineage meets with that of Muhammad at Murra ibn Ka'b.

Acceptance of Islam 
Muhammad Marmaduke Pickthall describes how Abu Bakr, after embracing Islam, immediately urged his closest associates to do likewise. Among them were Talha, Abd al-Rahman ibn Awf, Uthman ibn Affan, and Sa'd ibn Abi Waqqas. Talha was said to have been one of the first eight converts. 

Among the converts in Mecca, Talha was given a shared responsibility as a hafiz, people who memorized every verse of the Quran, along with Abu Bakr, Abd al-Rahman ibn Awf, Zubayr ibn al-Awwam and Sa'd ibn Abi Waqqas. During the persecution of the Muslims in 614–616, Nawfal ibn Khuwaylid tied Talha to Abu Bakr and left them roped together. Nobody from the Taym clan came to help. Thereafter they were known as "the Two Tied Together".

Migration to Medina 

In September 622, when Talha was returning from a business trip to Syria, he met with the Muslims who had left Mecca and were emigrating to Medina. Talha gave them some Syrian garments and mentioned that the Muslim community in Medina had said that their prophet was slow to arrive. As Muhammad and Abu Bakr continued to Medina, Talha returned to Mecca to put his affairs in order. Soon afterwards, he accompanied Abu Bakr's family to Medina, where he settled. 

At first he lodged with As'ad ibn Zurara, but later Muhammad gave him a block of land on which he built his own house. He was made the brother in Islam of Sa'id ibn Zayd. Talha and Sa'id missed fighting at the Battle of Badr because Muhammad sent them as scouts to locate Abu Sufyan's caravan. However, both were awarded shares of the plunder, as if they had been present.

Talha distinguished himself at the Battle of Uhud by keeping close to Muhammad while most of the Muslim army fled. He protected Muhammad's face from an arrow by taking the shot in his own hand, as a result of which his index and middle fingers were cut. He was also hit twice in the head, and it was said that he suffered a total of 39 or 75 wounds. Toward the end of the battle, Talha fainted from his heavy injuries, Abu Bakar soon reached their location to check Muhammad condition first, who immediately instructing Abu Bakar to check the condition of Talha, who already passed out due to his severe bloodloss. and his hand was left paralysed. For this heroic defence of Muhammad, Talha earned the byname "the living martyr". Abu Bakr also called the battle of Uhud "the day of Talha".

Talha fought at the Battle of the Trench and all the campaigns of Muhammad. During the Expedition of Dhu Qarad, Talha personally sponsored the operation through his wealth, thus causing Muhammad to give him the sobriquet "Talha al-Fayyad".

Talha is included among the ten to whom Paradise was promised.

Ridda Wars 
In the third week of July 632, Medina faced an imminent invasion by the apostate forces of Tulayha, a self-proclaimed prophet. Abu Bakr scraped together an army mainly from the Hashim clan (the clan of Muhammad), appointing Talha, Ali ibn Abi Talib and Zubayr each as commanders of one-third of the newly organised force.

Rashidun caliphate 
For the rest of his life, Talha served Majlis-ash-Shura as a council member of the Rashidun caliphate.

In 635 to 636, caliph Umar assembled his council, including Zubayr, Ali and Talha, about the battle plan to face the Persian army of Rostam Farrokhzad in Qadisiyyah. At first the caliph himself led the forces from Arabia to Iraq, but the council urges Umar not to lead the army in person and instead appoint someone else, as his presence was needed more urgently in the capital. Umar agreed and asked the council to suggest a commander. The council agreed to send Sa'd ibn Abi Waqqas; Sa'd served as the overall commander on Persian conquest and won the Battle of al-Qadisiyyah.

Later, the caliph heard that Sassanid forces from Mah, Qom, Hamadan, Ray, Isfahan, Azerbaijan, and Nahavand had gathered in Nahavand to counter the Arab invasion. Caliph Umar responded by assembling a war council consisting of Zubayr, Ali, Uthman ibn Affan, Talha, Sa'd ibn Abi Waqqas, Abd al-Rahman ibn Awf, and Abbas ibn Abd al-Muttalib to discuss the strategy to face the Sassanids in Nahavand. The caliph want to lead the army himself, but Ali urged the caliph to instead delegate the battlefield commands to the field commanders, prompting the caliph decides instead delegate the reinforcement commands to Zubayr, Tulayha, Amr ibn Ma'adi Yakrib, Abdullah ibn Amr Al-Ash'ath ibn Qays and others under the command of Al-Nu'man ibn Muqrin to go to Nahavand, to face the army of the Sasanian Empire in the battle of Nahavand.

Battle of the Camel and death 
 The Battle of the Camel was fought between Ali on one side and Aisha, Talha and Zubayr on the other on 10 December 656. According to some sources, during the battle, Marwan ibn al-Hakam, who was fighting on the same side as Aisha, shot Talha in the thigh. Marwan commented, "After this, I will never again seek a killer of Uthman.". His motivations for killing Talha were because of Talha's involvement in the killing of Uthman. Other sources attribute Talha's death to being killed by Ali's supporters while retreating from the field.

Family 
Talha had at least fifteen children by at least eight different women.

The known descendants of Talha by his various wives and concubines have divided into six lines.

Personal characteristics 
Talha was described as a dark-skinned man with a great deal of wavy hair, a handsome face and a narrow nose. He liked to wear saffron-dyed clothes and musk. He walked swiftly and, when nervous, he would toy with his ring, which was of gold and set with a ruby.

Talha was a successful cloth-merchant who eventually left an estate estimated at 30 million dirhams. According to modern writer Asad Ahmed, Talha possessed wealth that second only to that of Uthman ibn Affan. A report from Munzir ibn Sawa Al-Tamimi states that Talha had one property in Iraq that yielded four to five hundred dinar in gold. His enterprises included the initiation of al-Qumh (wheat) agricultural work among his community. Talha was said to have accumulated his lucrative properties and wealth by exchanging those that he acquired from the battle of Khaybar for the properties in Iraq that were possessed by Arab Hejazi settlers there and from the transaction of several land properties in Hadhramaut with Uthman. Talha is also said to have drawn profits from his lifetime of trade in Syria and Yemen.

Tomb 
The tomb of Talha ibn Ubayd Allah is located in Basra, Iraq. It is near a large mosque with modern architecture. The grave itself is under the cenotaph under the dome, which is built in a similar style to the cenotaph of Anas ibn Malik.

See also 
Sunni view of the Sahaba
List of Sahabah
The ten to whom Paradise was promised
Aisha
Banu Taym

References

Sources 
 
 
 

594 births
656 deaths
6th-century Arabs
7th-century Arabs
Arab Muslims
Sahabah killed in battle
Sahabah who participated in the battle of Uhud
People of the First Fitna
Sahabah hadith narrators
Military personnel killed by friendly fire
Banu Taym